Brøndby may refer to:

Brøndby, a Danish municipality in Region Hovedstaden
Brøndbyvester, a civil parish and the municipal seat of Brøndby
Brøndbyøster, a civil parish of Brøndby
Brøndby Strand, a civil parish of Brøndby
Brøndby IF, a Danish football club of Brøndby